John Ruganda (30 May 1941 to 8 December 2007) was Uganda's best known playwright. Beyond his work as a playwright, Ruganda was also a professor at University of North, South Africa, University of Nairobi, and Makerere University.

He was born in Fort Portal and died in Uganda's capital Kampala. 

Ruganda's plays "reflect the reality of the East African sociopolitical situation after independence."  He was considered a shaping force of East African theater. The Burdens (1972) and The Floods (1980) have become a regular part of curriculum in literature classes.

Bibliography

Plays
 The Burdens, Kampala, Uganda, National Theatre, January 1970
 Black Mamba, Kampala, 1972
 The Good Woman of Setzuan, by Bertolt Brecht, translated into Swahili by Ruganda, Nairobi, Nairobi University Players, November 1978
 The Floods, Nairobi, French Cultural Centre, 1 March 1979
 Music without Tears, Nairobi, Nairobi University Players, February 1982
 Echoes of Silence, Nairobi, 1985
Shreds of Tenderness

Television
 The Secret of the Season, screenplay by Ruganda, Voice of Kenya, March 1973
 The Floods, screenplay by Ruganda, Voice of Kenya, April 1973
 The Illegitimate, screenplay by Ruganda, Voice of Kenya, August 1982

References

Further reading
 Horn, "Uhuru to Amin: The Golden Decade of Theatre in Uganda," Literary Half-Yearly, 19, no. 1 (1978): 22-49
 Peter Nazareth, "Africa under Neocolonialism: New East African Writing," Busara, 6, no. 1  (1974): 19-32
 Mineke Schipper, Theatre and Society in Africa (Johannesburg: Ravan Press, 1982).

1941 births
2007 deaths
Ugandan dramatists and playwrights
Academic staff of Makerere University
20th-century dramatists and playwrights